We Are Motörhead is the fifteenth studio album by British rock band Motörhead. It was released on 15 May 2000 via Steamhammer, their fifth with the label, equalling their Bronze Records total of full length original album releases.

Recording
The album contains a cover of the punk band The Sex Pistols' song "God Save the Queen", for which the band recorded a promo video atop an open-top London AEC Routemaster bus. In the Motörhead documentary The Guts and the Glory, vocalist and bassist Lemmy Kilmister declares:

Release
At the time of We Are Motörhead's release, the band was in competition with itself as the compilations Deaf Forever: The Best of Motörhead and The Best of Motörhead also came out, something the band had no control over.

Artwork
Joe Petagno, the sleeve artist, commented on the influences behind the cover concept:

Critical reception
AllMusic review states:

Track listing

Personnel
Adapted from the album's liner notes.
 Lemmy – lead vocals, bass
 Phil Campbell – lead guitar
 Mikkey Dee – drums

Production
Bob Kulick –  producer
Bruce Bouillet – producer
Duane Baron  – producer
Bill Cooper –  engineer
Motörhead – executive producers
Mark Ambramson – design
Zen Jam – design
Stefan Chirazi – concept
Glen La Ferman – design
Stephanie Cabral – design
Annamaria DiSanto  – design
G$ – photography
Joe Petagno – album cover, Snaggletooth
Lemmy –  album cover, Snaggletooth

Charts

References

External links
 Sample tracks at Rolling Stone
 Motörhead official website

2000 albums
Motörhead albums
Albums with cover art by Joe Petagno
CMC International albums